Arne Pander (1931–2015) was an international speedway rider from Denmark.

Speedway career 
Pander was a two times champion of Denmark, winning the Danish Championship in 1956 and 1958. He rode in the top tier of British Speedway from 1965 to 1969, riding primarily for Oxford Cheetahs. He was capped by Denmark 16 times.

References 

Living people
1931 births
2015 deaths
Danish speedway riders
Oxford Cheetahs riders
Poole Pirates riders
Halifax Dukes riders
People from Herning Municipality
Sportspeople from the Central Denmark Region